Orange lungless spider refers to the following genera:

 Caponia, the eight-eyed orange lungless spiders
 Diploglena, the two-eyed orange lungless spider

Animal common name disambiguation pages